Albert Edward "Ab" Hardy (October 6, 1909 – October 2002) was a Canadian speed skater who competed at the 1948 Winter Olympics.

References

External links
 
 

1909 births
Date of death missing
People from Lévis, Quebec
Sportspeople from Quebec
Canadian male speed skaters
Speed skaters at the 1948 Winter Olympics
Olympic speed skaters of Canada
2002 deaths
20th-century Canadian people